
Year 809 (DCCCIX) was a common year starting on Monday (link will display the full calendar) of the Julian calendar.

Events 
 By place 

 Byzantine Empire 
 Spring – Siege of Serdica: Krum, ruler (khan) of the Bulgarian Empire, captures the fortress of Serdica (modern Sofia), after a long siege. According to Byzantine sources, he massacres the garrison (supposedly 6,000 men), sacks the city, and razes the city walls, before returning with much loot to Bulgaria. In the following years (and centuries), Serdica will serve as a base for the expansion of the Bulgars to the south of the Balkans.

 Europe 
 A Byzantine fleet lands in the Venetian Lagoon, and attacks a Frankish flotilla at Comacchio, but is defeated. Doge Obelerio degli Antenori marries a Frankish bride, Carola; she becomes the first dogaressa of Venice.
 Aznar Galíndez I succeeds Aureolus, as count of Aragon (modern Spain). He is installed by King Louis the Pious (a son of emperor Charlemagne), and remains a Frankish vassal.
 A rebellion in Gharb al-Andalus (modern Portugal) is crushed by the Emirate of Córdoba.

 Abbasid Caliphate 

 March 24 – Caliph Harun al-Rashid dies at Tus, on an expedition to put down an uprising in Khorasan (modern Iran). He is succeeded by his son Muhammad ibn Harun al-Amin.

 Asia 
 Emperor Heizei becomes ill, and abdicates the throne in favor of his brother Saga, who is installed as the 52nd emperor of Japan.
 Emperor Govinda III defeats his rival Nagabhata II, and obtains the submission of the Pala Empire (India).Dynastic History of Magadha by George E. Somers, p. 179

 By topic 

 Religion 
 Council of Aachen (809): Frankish bishops adopt the filioque addition in the Creed.  Pope Leo III intervenes, and refuses to recognize it as valid.

Births 
 Hunayn ibn Ishaq, Muslim scholar and physician (d. 873)
 Jing Zong, emperor of the Tang Dynasty (d. 827)
 Wen Zong, emperor of the Tang Dynasty (d. 840)

Deaths 
 March 24 – Harun al-Rashid, Muslim caliph (b. 763)
 March 26 – Ludger, Frisian missionary
 July 14 – Ōtomo no Otomaro, Japanese general  and Shōgun  (b. 731)
 Abbas ibn al-Ahnaf, Muslim poet (b. 750)
 Aejang, king of Silla (b. 788) 
 Aureolus of Aragon, Frankish nobleman
 Cellach Tosach mac Donngaile, Irish king 
 Elfodd, Welsh bishop (approximate date)
 Gang, king of Balhae (Korea)
 Wang Shizhen, Chinese general (b. 759)

References

Sources